Oxyurus is a genus of millipedes belonging to the family Xystodesmidae.

The species of this genus are found in Southern America.

Species:

Oxyurus cinerascens 
Oxyurus flavolimbatus 
Oxyurus glabratus 
Oxyurus pallidus 
Oxyurus roseus 
Oxyurus vestita 
Oxyurus vestitus

References

Xystodesmidae
Millipede genera